Vitta rubricata is a species of small freshwater snail with an operculum, an aquatic gastropod mollusk in the family Neritidae, the nerites.

Distribution
This species is found in Africa, in Benin, Cameroon, Ivory Coast, Gabon, Gambia, Ghana, Guinea, Guinea-Bissau, Liberia, Nigeria, Senegal, Sierra Leone, and Togo.

Habitat
This nerite lives in rivers.

References

 Morelet, A. (1858). Séries conchyliologiques comprenant l'énumération de mollusques terrestres et fluviatiles recueillis pendant le cours de différents voyages, ainsi que la description de plusieurs espèces nouvelles 1. Klincksieck, Paris. 1-34, pls
 Brown, D.S. 2000.  Neritina rubricata.   2006 IUCN Red List of Threatened Species.   Downloaded on 7 August 2007.
 Breure, A. S. H., Audibert, C., Ablett, J. D. (2018). Pierre Marie Arthur Morelet (1809-1892) and his contributions to malacology. Leiden: Nederlandse Malacologische Vereniging. 544 pp.
 Eichhorst T.E. (2016). Neritidae of the world. Volume 2. Harxheim: Conchbooks. Pp. 696-1366

Neritidae
Freshwater snails of Africa
Invertebrates of West Africa
Invertebrates of Cameroon
Invertebrates of Gabon
Invertebrates of Guinea
Gastropods described in 1858